Laguna~B is an Italian company specialized in the production of design glassware. Since 2016 it has been led by CEO and Art Director Marcantonio Brandolini D’Adda. It is headquartered in Venice.

History
Laguna~B was founded in 1994 by Marie Angliviel de la Beaumelle, a pioneer in the glass design industry. The company transformed the “goti da fornasa” – the glasses that Venetian glass makers made for their own personal use to quench their thirst while working at the furnace – into an iconic and characteristic product. In 2016, the son of Marie, Marcantonio Brandolini D’Adda, took over the leadership of the company and reorganised its structure, transforming it into a leader in its field.

Activities and projects
Laguna~B has collaborated with many local and international partners over the years. In 2017, the company launched the “Autonoma” exchange programme on Murano Island, bringing foreign glassmaking masters and artists to the lagoon to promote glassmaking and glassblowing. Furthermore, it fostered glass design culture with the “Arte Fragile” and “Indefinito” projects.

The company's commitment to sustainability led to the VITAL project, which is carried out with “We are here Venice” association. VITAL is a group of experts dedicated to preserving the Venetian Lagoon, guided by the latest scientific research and local knowledge. The ecological heritage of the Lagoon is considered a form of natural capital that produces different types of wealth. VITAL is committed to finding ways to protect and enhance this natural capital/asset for the benefit of current and future generations. Laguna~B also collaborated with the Iuav University of Venice in a project aimed at renovating the historic Pitau furnace in Murano in a contemporary key.

Artists who collaborated with Laguna~B include Frédéric Malle – who created a limited-edition line of five precious candles in hand-blown Murano glass – Diptyque, Duncan Campbell and Charlotte Rey, and Cabana Magazine.

See also
Marie Angliviel de la Beaumelle
Murano
Glassblowing
Università Iuav di Venezia
Diptyque

References

Glassmaking companies of Italy
Italian companies established in 1994